A Um Deus Desconhecido (Portuguese words for "To an unknown God") is Sétima Legião debut album released in July 1984.
Although it wasn't the most commercially successful album by the band, it is still regarded as one of the most important albums in the development of Portuguese rock.

Track listing
 Glória - 4:20
 A Partida - 5:11
 Com O Vento - 4:45
 Manto Branco - 5:00
 O Canto E O Gelo - 3:35
 Mar D'Outubro - 3:09
 Ritual - 3:55
 Vertigem - 4:36
 Aguarela - 3:59
 A Partida (Versão) - 4:50
 Porta Do Sol - 4:03
 Pois Que Deus Assim O Quis - 4:30 
 Anos Depois - 1:18

All Songs written by Francisco Menezes except Glória written by Miguel Esteves Cardoso

Credits
 Pedro Oliveira - lead vocals, guitar
 Rodrigo Leão - bass guitar, keyboards
 Nuno Cruz - drums
 Paulo Marinho - bagpipes
 Francisco Menezes - backing vocals

References

1984 debut albums